Isireli Naikelekelevesi (born 17 December 1976) is a Fijian former middle-distance runner who specialised in the 800 metres. He is the Fijian national record holder in that event.

Born in Suva, he represented his country at the Summer Olympics in 1996, 2000 and 2004. In 1996 he anchored a 4 × 400 metres relay team including Soloveni Nakaunicina, Henry Semiti and Solomone Bole, while in the latter two years he ran in the heats of the 800 m. He competed in the 800 m heats at the 2001 World Championships in Athletics and also appeared at the Commonwealth Games in 1998 and 2002 (reaching the semi-finals on his second attempt). He ran for Fiji at the IAAF World Cross Country Championships in both 1996 and 1998.

His greatest successes came at regional level. He began with a 5000 metres bronze at the 1994 Oceania Junior Athletics Championships. He won three back-to-back middle-distance doubles at the South Pacific Games (1995, 1999, 2003) and also claimed a 400 metres bronze and relay silver in 2003. He remains the Games record holder in the 800 m. At the South Pacific Mini Games, he won a middle-distance double and took steeplechase bronze. The following edition in 2001 brought a sweep from 400 m to 1500 m and a fourth gold in the relay. At the 2005 edition he was edged out in the 1500 m by Samoa's Setefano Mika, but retained his 800 m and relay titles.

At the Oceania Athletics Championships he was a mainstay of distance running for a decade. He won his first 5000 metres title at the 1996 Oceania Athletics Championships and also won silver in the 10,000 metres. He won the 800 m title in 2000, but was beaten into second by New Zealander Gareth Hyett in 2002. He was again 800 m runner-up in 2006 finishing behind Samoa's Aunese Curreen.

In his last major international events he took two middle-distance silver medals behind Curreen at the 2007 Pacific Games and 2008 Oceania Athletics Championships.

Personal bests
400 metres – 48.86 (2001)
800 metres – 1:48.70 min (2004) 
1500 metres – 3:53.22 min (2003)
Mile run – 4:14.24 min (2004) 
5000 metres – 16:42.3 min (1994)

All information from All Athletics and IAAF

International competitions

References

External links

Living people
1976 births
People from Suva
Fijian male middle-distance runners
Olympic athletes of Fiji
Athletes (track and field) at the 1996 Summer Olympics
Athletes (track and field) at the 2000 Summer Olympics
Athletes (track and field) at the 2004 Summer Olympics
Commonwealth Games competitors for Fiji
Athletes (track and field) at the 1998 Commonwealth Games
Athletes (track and field) at the 2002 Commonwealth Games
World Athletics Championships athletes for Fiji